Gyazo is an open-source and free screenshot program for Windows, macOS, and Linux. The program allows users to create screenshots and upload them to the web, producing a unique URL to the screenshot.

Features

Screenshots and animated GIFs
Gyazo has a minimal user interface consisting of a small set of options available by right clicking the taskbar icon. Launching the application displays a crosshair cursor with which the user selects the area to be uploaded. Gyazo uploads the image to their servers, and then opens a browser pointing to the unique URL for the image, which can then be shared publicly. With the release of version 2.0 Gyazo also includes the ability to select a portion of the screen for GIF capture and allows users to create animated GIF or MP4 video for up to ten seconds.

Image uploading
Gyazo also allows users to upload any image by dragging the image to the Gyazo icon. As of May 15, 2015, version 2.4 added support for uploading an image without opening a new tab in your web browser.

Cloud storage
Gyazo uploads every screenshot to their servers, basically allowing free cloud storage, which Gyazo says can be used indefinitely.

Ivy Search 
Ivy Search is a feature of Gyazo that lets Ninja users (for the time being) find an image from a vague idea with related images. According to Gyazo's blog,  Ivy Search works the same way that you recall things in your brain.

Premium accounts (Ninja)
Users can upgrade their free account to premium for a monthly subscription fee. Premium users have access to unlimited storage and uploading, the ability to draw arrows on images, the ability to use Ivy Search as of version 3.0, and see no advertisements.

References

External links

Free utility software
Screenshot software
Utility software for Linux
Utilities for macOS
Utilities for Windows